Julie White Walker is an American librarian and currently the state librarian of Georgia. She earned her bachelor’s degree in political science from the University of North Carolina at Chapel Hill. In 1982, she earned her master’s in library science from the same university.

Career 
Following her graduation, she worked for different libraries across North Carolina. In 1990, she became the assistant director of the Athens Regional Library System. She then served as the first director for the Public Information Network for Electronic Services (PINES) from 2003-2006. From 2006-2008, she was the assistant state librarian for support services and strategic initiatives. She became the deputy state librarian of Georgia Public Library Service (GPLS) in 2008, serving until her appointment as state librarian in 2014.

Alongside her position as state librarian, Walker also serves as the Vice Chancellor for Libraries and Archives University System of Georgia, and served on the board of directors of the Chief Officers of State Library Agencies (COSLA) 2018-2022.  On 23 September 2020, she was elected Vice President/President Elect of COSLA. Walker took office as President of COSLA on 27 October 2022.

References 

Living people
American librarians
American women librarians
Year of birth missing (living people)
Place of birth missing (living people)
University of North Carolina at Chapel Hill alumni
People from North Carolina
People from Athens, Georgia
UNC School of Information and Library Science alumni
21st-century American women